This is a list of football video games based on/licensed by the K League.

The first licensed game, K-League Stars 2001, was released for the Windows on April 28, 2000.

Game Boy Advance 
 FIFA Soccer (2002)
 FIFA 2004 (2003)
 FIFA 2005 (2004)
 FIFA 06 (2005)
 FIFA 07 (2006)
 FIFA 08 (2007)

Nintendo DS

PlayStation 
 FIFA 2001 (2000)
 FIFA 2002 (2001)
 FIFA 2003 (2002)
 FIFA 2004 (2003)
 FIFA 2005 (2004)

PlayStation 2 
 FIFA 2001 (2000)
 FIFA 2002 (2001)
 FIFA 2003 (2002)
 FIFA 2004 (2003)
 FIFA 2005 (2004)
 K-League Winning Eleven 8: Asia Championship (2004)
 FIFA 06 (2005)
 K-League Winning Eleven 9: Asia Championship (2005)
 FIFA 07 (2006)
 FIFA 08 (2007)
 FIFA 09 (2008)
 FIFA 10 (2009)
 FIFA 11 (2010)
 FIFA 12 (2011)
 FIFA 13 (2012)

PlayStation 3 
 FIFA 08 (2007)
 FIFA 09 (2008)
 FIFA 10 (2009)
 FIFA 11 (2010)
 FIFA 12 (2011)
 FIFA 13 (2012)
 FIFA 14 (2013)

PlayStation Portable 
 FIFA 2005 (2004)
 FIFA 06 (2005)
 FIFA 07 (2006)
 FIFA 08 (2007)
 FIFA 09 (2008)
 FIFA 10 (2009)
 FIFA 11 (2010)
 FIFA 12 (2011)
 FIFA 13 (2012)
 FIFA 14 (2013)

PlayStation Vita 
 FIFA 13 (2012)
 FIFA 14 (2013)

Mobile 
 FIFA 2003 (2002)
 FIFA 2004 (2003)
 FIFA 2005 (2004)
 FIFA 06 (2005)
 FIFA 07 (2006)
 FIFA 08 (2007)
 FIFA 09 (2008)
 FIFA 10 (2009)
 FIFA 11 (2010)
 FIFA 12 (2011)
 FIFA 13 (2012)

PC (Windows) 
 K-League Stars 2001 (2000)
 FIFA 2001 (2000)
 FIFA 2002 (2001)
 FIFA 2003 (2002)
 FIFA 2004 (2003)
 FIFA 2005 (2004)
 FIFA 06 (2005)
 FIFA Online (2006)
 FIFA 07 (2006)
 FIFA 08 (2007)
 FIFA Online 2 (2007)
 FIFA 09 (2008)
 FIFA 10 (2009)
 FIFA 11 (2010)
 FC Manager (2011)
 FIFA 12 (2011)
 FIFA 13 (2012)
 FIFA Online 3 (2012)
 Chagu Chagu (2013)
 FIFA 14 (2013)

See also 
 List of J. League licensed video games

References

Video games
K League
K League
K League